Cerovec pri Črešnjevcu is a settlement in the Municipality of Semič in southeastern Slovenia. The area is part of the historical region of Lower Carniola and the municipality is now included in the Southeast Slovenia Statistical Region.

Name
The name of the settlement was changed from Cerovec to Cerovec pri Črešnjevcu in 1955.

References

External links
Cerovec pri Črešnjevcu at Geopedia

Populated places in the Municipality of Semič